is a Japanese track and field athlete who specialises in the 110 metres hurdles. He won the Bronze medal at the Asian Championships in Pune at the 110 m hurdles. His personal best is 13.47 seconds, set in Tottori on 5 June 2016.

Personal bests

Records
110 m hurdles (91.4 cm)
Current Japan's junior high school record holder - 13.84 s (+0.6 m/s) (Marugame, 21 August 2006)
110 m hurdles (99.1 cm)
Former Japan's youth best holder - 13.67 s (-1.0 m/s) (Bydgoszcz, 12 July 2008)

Competition record

National Championship

References

External links
 
 Wataru Yazawa at JAAF 
 

1991 births
Living people
Sportspeople from Yokohama
Japanese male hurdlers
Olympic male hurdlers
Olympic athletes of Japan
Athletes (track and field) at the 2016 Summer Olympics
Japan Championships in Athletics winners
Competitors at the 2011 Summer Universiade